Angel Leigh McCoy is a game designer and fiction writer based in Seattle, Washington.

Early life and education
Originally from the Midwest, Angel Leigh McCoy grew up delving into fantasy and horror novels and won her first essay contest in sixth grade. She studied French Literature at the University of Illinois in Champaign-Urbana.

Career
She is credited with published work in the role-playing games industry as far back as 1994. Over the years, she has designed RPG material for companies such as White Wolf, Wizards of the Coast, FASA, and Pinnacle Entertainment Group. In 2001, she was writing in the video game industry for Microsoft Game Studios, writing articles as Xbox.com correspondent Wireless Angel. She transferred to ArenaNet in 2007, where she was part of a team effort to make the MMORPG Guild Wars 2.

Her side projects have included: founding and providing creative direction for an indie game team (Games Omniverse LLC); short fiction writing; webmaster for the Horror Writers Association; producing the Wily Writers Speculative Fiction Podcast; and editing short story anthologies "Deep Cuts", and "Another Dimension Anthology".

Publications

Novella
 Charlie Darwin, or the Trine of 1809 by Nevermet Press, 2011.

Short fiction
McCoy has published short fiction in various anthologies and magazines, including:

 Ravens in the Library by Quiet Thunder
 Vile Things: Extreme Deviations of Horror by Comet Press
 Masters of Horror Anthology by Triskaideka Books
 Cobalt City Christmas by Timid Pirates Productions.
 Fear of the Dark by HorrorBound 
 Growing Dread: Biopunk Visions by Timid Pirate Publishing 
 Tales for Canterbury by Random Static 
 Necrotic Tissue, issue 14, Stygian Publications

Computer game work
McCoy worked as a game reviewer and journalist for Microsoft Game Studios and Xbox. She currently works for ArenaNet as lore and narrative designer on Guild Wars 2.

Role-playing game work
McCoy's work in the role-playing game industry includes supplements for Wizards of the Coast's Forgotten Realms; FASA's Earthdawn; West End Games' World of Necroscope; Pinnacle Entertainment's Deadlands; and White Wolf's Mage: The Ascension, Vampire: The Masquerade, Hunter: The Reckoning and Changeling: The Dreaming.

Dungeons & Dragons product line, TSR
 * The Magic of Faerun, co-author; 2000

Changeling: the Dreaming product line, White Wolf Publishing & ArtHaus Publishing
 * Pooka Kithbook, ArtHaus Publishing; 1999
 * Inanimae, contributing author; 1998
 * Satyr Kithbook, 1997
 * Player's Guide, contributing author, 1997
 * Second Edition, contributing author, 1997
 * Storyteller's Guide, contributing author; 1995
 * Shadows on the Hill, contributing author; 1995

Mage the Ascension product line, White Wolf Publishing
 * Manifesto, co-author, December 2002
 * Hollow Ones Sourcebook, co-author, June 2002
 * Mage Revised, contributing author, 1999
 * The Bygone Bestiary, contributing author, 1998
 * Technomancer's Toybox, contributing author, 1997
 * Beyond the Barriers, contributing author, 1996

Vampire: the Masquerade product line, White Wolf Publishing
 * Sins of the Blood, co-author, 2001
 * World of Darkness, Vol. II, contributing author; 1996

EverQuest Role-Playing Game product line, White Wolf Publishing
 * Monsters of Norrath, co-author, August 2002
 * Player's Handbook, co-author, July 2002

Hunter: The Reckoning product line, White Wolf Publishing
 * Defender Sourcebook, co-author; 1999
 * Survival Guide, contributing author; 1999
 * Hunter: the Reckoning, contributing author; 1999

Millennium's End product line, Chameleon Eclectic
 * The Medellín Agent, co-author; 1997
 * Overlay Accessory Kit, contributing author; 1994

Earthdawn product line, FASA Corporation
 * Magic, contributing author; 1995
 * Legends of Earthdawn, contributing author; 1995

Miscellaneous
 * Aberrant: Project Utopia, White Wolf Publishing, contributing author; 1999
 * Deadlands: Marshall Law, Pinnacle Entertainment Group, contributing author, 1996
 * World of Necroscope: Book of Adventures, West End Games, contributing author; 1995

References

External links
 
 Angel's Encyclopedia of Speculative Fiction entry
 The Locus Index to Science Fiction, 1999
 Wily Writers Speculative Fiction site

1962 births
21st-century American novelists
21st-century American short story writers
21st-century American women writers
American fantasy writers
American game designers
American horror writers
American online publication editors
American video game designers
American women novelists
American women short story writers
Dungeons & Dragons game designers
Guild Wars
Living people
Novelists from Illinois
People from Elgin, Illinois
University of Illinois Urbana-Champaign alumni
White Wolf game designers
Women horror writers
Women science fiction and fantasy writers
Women video game designers